White Island Shores is a census-designated place (CDP) in the town of Plymouth in Plymouth County, Massachusetts, United States, along the shores of White Island Pond. The population was 2,106 at the 2010 census.

Geography
White Island Shores is located at  (41.793928, -70.638531).

According to the United States Census Bureau, the CDP has a total area of 3.4 km (1.3 mi), of which 3.0 km (1.2 mi) is land and 0.4 km (0.2 mi) (11.36%) is water.

White Island Shores is also home to a new, A.D Makepeace, development, Redbrook. Redbrook is home to multiple restaurants, the Old Colony YMCA, retail spaces, healthcare buildings, apartments, and many single family homes.

Demographics

As of the census of 2000, there were 2,133 people, 722 households, and 547 families residing in the CDP. The population density was 703.9/km (1,818.5/mi). There were 876 housing units at an average density of 289.1/km (746.9/mi). The racial makeup of the CDP was 89.64% White, 2.91% African American, 0.84% Native American, 0.23% Asian, 0.14% Pacific Islander, 3.19% from other races, and 3.05% from two or more races. Hispanic or Latino of any race were 2.25% of the population.

There were 722 households, out of which 45.6% had children under the age of 18 living with them, 52.9% were married couples living together, 17.2% had a female householder with no husband present, and 24.1% were non-families. 18.0% of all households were made up of individuals, and 6.6% had someone living alone who was 65 years of age or older. The average household size was 2.95 and the average family size was 3.33.

In the CDP, the population was spread out, with 33.7% under the age of 18, 8.2% from 18 to 24, 32.1% from 25 to 44, 19.9% from 45 to 64, and 6.2% who were 65 years of age or older. The median age was 32 years. For every 100 females, there were 97.9 males. For every 100 females age 18 and over, there were 93.7 males.

The median income for a household in the CDP was $43,092, and the median income for a family was $43,191. Males had a median income of $36,399 versus $23,953 for females. The per capita income for the CDP was $18,722. About 5.5% of families and 5.4% of the population were below the poverty line, including 3.4% of those under age 18 and 21.8% of those age 65 or over.

See also
 Neighborhoods in Plymouth, Massachusetts

References

Neighborhoods in Plymouth, Massachusetts
Census-designated places in Plymouth County, Massachusetts
Census-designated places in Massachusetts